Clytus planifrons is a species of long-horned beetle in the family Cerambycidae. It was described by John Lawrence LeConte in 1874 and occurs on the Pacific coast of North America.

References

Clytini
Beetles of North America
Beetles described in 1874
Taxa named by John Lawrence LeConte